Armin Hodžić (born 29 February 2000) is a Bosnian professional footballer who plays as a central midfielder for Bosnian Premier League club Željezničar.

He started his professional career at Sloboda Tuzla, before joining Alcorcón in 2020, who loaned him to Estoril. Hodžić signed with Željezničar in 2022.

Club career

Early career
Born in Tuzla, Hodžić started playing football at his hometown club Sloboda. He made his debut on 3 March 2018, coming on as a late substitute for Miloš Mijić in a 1–1 home draw against Borac Banja Luka. Rarely used during his first two seasons, Hodžić started to feature more regularly during the 2019–20 season. He scored his first goal for Sloboda on 17 August 2019, netting the equalizer in a 2–2 away draw against Željezničar.

On 5 October 2020, Hodžić signed for Spanish Segunda División club Alcorcón. Two days later, however, he was loaned to Liga Portugal 2 side Estoril. Hodžić made his debut on 21 December 2020, replacing Joãozinho late into a 1–1 home draw against Porto B.

Željezničar
On 28 February 2022, Hodžić joined Željezničar on a free transfer. He made his debut on 5 March 2022, in a Sarajevo derby match against FK Sarajevo, scoring his first goal for Željezničar as well.

On 23 June 2022, Hodžić extended his contract until the summer of 2023.

International career
Hodžić was a member of the Bosnia and Herzegovina national under-21 team.

Honours
Estoril
Liga Portugal 2: 2020–21

References

External links

2000 births
Living people
Sportspeople from Tuzla
Association football midfielders
Bosnia and Herzegovina footballers
Bosnia and Herzegovina under-21 international footballers
FK Sloboda Tuzla players
AD Alcorcón footballers
G.D. Estoril Praia players
FK Željezničar Sarajevo players
Premier League of Bosnia and Herzegovina players
Liga Portugal 2 players
Bosnia and Herzegovina expatriate footballers
Expatriate footballers in Spain
Bosnia and Herzegovina expatriate sportspeople in Spain
Expatriate footballers in Portugal
Bosnia and Herzegovina expatriate sportspeople in Portugal